Dabung Girl (Hindi: दबंग गर्ल) is a fictional, Indian comic book superhero character. Dabung Girl is an Indian adolescent girl superhero focusing on breaking gender stereotypes. She was created by life skills educationist Saurabh Agarwal. Dabung Girl’s stories are presented as a comic book series. The word Dabung means ‘fearless’ in English.

Key characters 

 Tara/Dabung Girl: Dabung Girl aka Tara is a regular village girl. Tara transforms herself into Dabung Girl by saying Kavooom!!!
 SuperAvni (aka Maya): Tara’s elder sister.
 Purple Flame (aka Riya): Dabung Girl’s friend, who is also a superhero and has dyslexia.

Awards and recognition

References

External links 
 dabunggirl.com

2019 comics debuts
Indian comics
Female superheroes